René Andrieu (Beauregard, 1920–1998) was a French Communist Resistance fighter, journalist and politician. He served in the Francs-Tireurs et Partisans during  World War II, and headed the Communist newspaper l'Humanité from 1958 to 1984. He was also part of the Central Committee of the French Communist Party.

Works 
 Les communistes et la révolution, Julliard, 1968
 Du bonheur et rien d'autre, Robert Laffont, 1975
 Choses dites, Editions Sociales, 1979
 Stendhal ou le bal masqué, J. C. Lattès, 1983
 Un rêve fou ? Un journaliste dans le siècle, L’Archipel, 1996

1920 births
1998 deaths
People from Lot (department)
French Communist Party politicians
Members of the Francs-tireurs et partisans
French male non-fiction writers
20th-century French journalists
20th-century French male writers